Haataja is a surname. Notable people with the surname include:

 Juha-Pekka Haataja (born 1982), Finnish ice hockey player
Katherine Haataja (born 1969), Finnish-Swedish mezzo-soprano
 Kyösti Haataja (1881–1956), Finnish politician

Finnish-language surnames